Forum Palace is a commercial center and indoor arena in Vilnius. Arena located near to Vilnius financial centre in Konstitucija avenue. Forum Palace is often used to host music events and concerts.

References

External links 
Official website

Indoor arenas in Lithuania
Music venues in Lithuania
Commercial buildings completed in 2003
Buildings and structures in Vilnius
Sports venues completed in 2003
2003 establishments in Lithuania
Music venues completed in 2003